Mundulea striata is a plant species in the genus Mundulea.

The pterocarpan striatine can be isolated from aerial parts of M. striata.

References

 Mundulea striata on www.efloras.org

Millettieae
Plants described in 1883